St. Vincent is a hamlet in northern Alberta, Canada within the County of St. Paul No. 19.

St. Vincent is the subject of a lengthy profile on the Alberta Online Encyclopedia, as a case study of a Franco-Albertan settlement.

Demographics 
St. Vincent recorded a population of 43 in the 1991 Census of Population conducted by Statistics Canada.

See also 
List of communities in Alberta
List of hamlets in Alberta

References 

Hamlets in Alberta
County of St. Paul No. 19